Dalkalaen is a Central Vanuatu language spoken by about 1,000 people on the southwestern tip of Ambrym Island, Vanuatu.

Dalkalaen is closely related to the Daakaka language.

Notes

References
 .
 Krifka, Manfred; von Prince, Kilu; Hosni, Soraya. 2012. West Ambrym: Documenting and maintaining three Oceanic languages of Vanuatu. Poster presenting the three languages Dalkalaen, Daakaka, and Daakie. Berlin: DoBeS.

Paama–Ambrym languages
Languages of Vanuatu